Year 983 (CMLXXXIII) was a common year starting on Monday (link will display the full calendar) of the Julian calendar.

Events 
 By place 

 Europe 
 Summer – Diet of Verona: Emperor Otto II (the Red) declares war against the Byzantine Empire and the Emirate of Sicily. He assembles a large expeditionary force for a renewal of an invasion in Calabria (Southern Italy). Otto gifts the Rheingau ("Rhine District") to the Archbishopric of Mainz during the 'Veronese donation'. Otto III is elected king of Germany and Italy.
 Great Slav Rising: The Polabian Slavs (Wends), mainly Lutici and Obotrite tribes living east of the Elbe River revolt against Christianity and  their subjugation to the German (former East Frankish) realm of the Holy Roman Empire. They invade northern Germany, sacking the cities of Havelberg, Brandenburg and Hamburg.
 King Harald Bluetooth rebels against the overlordship of Otto II. A Danish Viking army under his son Sweyn Forkbeard invades the March of Schleswig – along the northern border of modern Denmark. The Sorb Slavs in northern Germany overrun and conquer the March of Zeitz (Marca Geronis) from Saxon control.
 December 7 – Otto II dies from a fever in his palace at Rome after a 10-year reign. He is succeeded by his 3-year-old son, Otto III.
 December 25 – Otto III is crowned at Aachen by Archbishops Willigis of Mainz and John X of Ravenna. The Holy Roman Empire comes under the regency of his mother, Empress consort Theophanu.

 Arabian Empire 
 March 26 – 'Adud al-Dawla, ruler (emir) of the Buyid Dynasty, dies after a 34-year reign. He is succeeded by his 20-year-old son Samsam al-Dawla, who is recognised by the Abbasid Caliphate. During al-Dawla's rule his dominions are divided through civil war and revolts (until 987). 
 Fall – Fatimid troops under the defecting Hamdanid governor of Homs, Bakjur, attack Aleppo (modern Syria), but are repulsed through the intervention of the Byzantine army. Bardas Phokas (the Younger) sacks the city, while Bakjur flees to Fatimid territory in Egypt.

 China 
 Emperor Sheng Zong of the Khitan-led Liao Dynasty leads an expeditionary force against the Zubu after they killed their own khan and begin to act in defiance of the Khitan.
 One of the Four Great Books of Song, the encyclopedia Imperial Readings of the Taiping Era is completed in 1,000 volumes, of 4.7 million written Chinese characters.

 By topic 

 Religion 
 July 10 – Pope Benedict VII dies after a 9-year reign. Otto II secures the election of the imperial chancellor and appoints John XIV as the 136th pope of the Catholic Church.

Births 
 Abd al-Rahman Sanchuelo, Umayyad chief minister (d. 1009)
 Anthony of Kiev, Rus' monk and saint (d. 1073)
 Gunnlaugr Ormstunga, Icelandic poet (approximate date)
 Odo II, French nobleman and pretender (d. 1037)
 Wulfnoth Cild, Anglo-Norse nobleman (approximate date)

Deaths 
 March 26 – 'Adud al-Dawla, ruler of the Buyid Dynasty (b. 936) 
 July 10 – Benedict VII, pope of the Catholic Church
 December 7 – Otto II, Holy Roman Emperor (b. 955)
 Aed Ua Dubhda, king of Uí Fiachrach (Ireland)
 Ælfhere, Anglo-Saxon ealdorman (approximate date)
 Antony III (the Studite), patriarch of Constantinople
 Ibrahim ibn Marzuban, ruler of the Sallarid Dynasty
 Minamoto no Muneyuki, Japanese nobleman and poet
 Minamoto no Shitagō, Japanese waka poet (b. 911)
 Mu'ayyad al-Dawla, ruler of the Buyid Dynasty (b. 942)

References